Markos Kalovelonis (born 18 May 1994) is a Greek-Russian tennis player.

Kalovelonis has a career high ATP singles ranking of World No. 445 achieved on 16 June 2016. He also has a career high ATP doubles ranking of World No. 187 achieved on 20 June 2022. Kalovelonis has won 21 ITF doubles titles.

Kalovelonis has represented Greece at the Davis Cup where he has a W/L record of 6–5.
He also represented Greece in the ATP Cup in 2020 and 2021.

Kalovelonis is the son of former Greek tennis player, George Kalovelonis and Russian Karina Nazarenko. In 2014, Kalovelonis decided to represent Russia instead of Greece. In 2019, Kalovelonis switched back to represent Greece.
He is fluent in Russian,Greek and English.

Futures and Challenger finals

Singles: 4 (0–4)

Doubles: 49 (22–27)

External links

1994 births
Living people
Russian male tennis players
Greek male tennis players
Competitors at the 2013 Mediterranean Games
Sportspeople from Athens
Russian people of Greek descent
Greek people of Russian descent
Mediterranean Games competitors for Greece